Pavel Nazarenko (born 20 January 1995) is a Belarusian professional footballer who plays for Zhetysu.

Career

Club
On 18 June 2022, Nazarenko left Shakhter Karagandy.

Honours
Dinamo Brest
Belarusian Cup winner: 2016–17

References

External links
 
 
 Profile at Dinamo Minsk website

1995 births
Living people
Belarusian footballers
Association football defenders
Belarusian expatriate footballers
Expatriate footballers in Kazakhstan
FC Dinamo Minsk players
FC Bereza-2010 players
FC Belshina Bobruisk players
FC Dynamo Brest players
FC Gorodeya players
FC Slutsk players
FC Vitebsk players
FC Akzhayik players
FC Shakhter Karagandy players
FC Zhetysu players